is a 2015 Japanese television drama based on the novel Tennō no Ryōriban by Hisahide Sugimori, depicting the life of imperial cook Tokuzō Akiyama. It premiered on TBS on 26 April 2015, starring Takeru Satoh in the lead role. The 1st episode is 108 minutes, 2nd, 3rd, and 6th episodes are 64 minutes long. The series was well received by the public, earning the highest viewership rating in its time slot during its run time.

Plot
Tokuzō Akiyama is a good-for-nothing young man living in the countryside, who gets easily absorbed in activities he finds interesting, but quickly loses interest and moves on, creating trouble for his family. He is married off to a merchant household to teach him discipline, and his wife gradually grows to love his personality. Tokuzō, however, falls in love again: this time with cooking. As he delivers goods to the army kitchen, the army chef introduces him to cutlet, which prompts Tokuzō to learn the craft. On a whim, he decides to leave his wife to study cooking in Tokyo. Amid hardship and humiliation, the young man who never felt compelled to stick to a job, keeps his dream to become the emperor's cook at only 25 years of age.

Cast
Takeru Satoh - Tokuzō Akiyama
Haru Kuroki - Toshiko Takahama
Kenta Kiritani - Shintarō Matsui
Tasuku Emoto - Tatsukichi Yamagami
Saki Takaoka - Ume Morita
Gajirō Satō - Sennosuke Morita
Sei Ashina - Kayano
Ryū Morioka - Kurasaburō Akiyama
Anna Ishibashi - Mitsuko Takahama
Yoshiyuki Tsubokura - Okumura
Jinta Nishizawa - Masashi Sasaki
Daisuke Kuroda - Araki
Takeshi Ōnishi - Sekiguchi
Mamoru Watanabe - Sugiyama
Hirotaka Ōkuma - Fujita
Yūji Kido - Suzuki
Ryōhei Suzuki - Shūtarō Akiyama
Tetsuya Takeda - Professor Shōgo Kirizuka
Hideaki Itō - Sergeant Yūkichi Tanabe (Cook of the 36th Infantry Regiment)
Yumi Asō - Okichi (Shūtarō's lodging house landlady)
Masaya Kato - Takeshirō Iogi (Chef to the British Minister to Japan)
Yōjin Hino - Kinnosuke Takahama
Satoko Ōshima - Harue Takahama
Jun Miho - Fuki Akiyama
Tetta Sugimoto - Shūzō Akiyama
Kaoru Kobayashi - Kamaichi Usami (Chef of the Peer's Club)
Hiromi Go - Japanese Ambassador to France Shin'ichirō Awano
Noémie Nakai - Simone
Kazuyuki Asano - Viscount Hayato Fukuba (Director of the Imperial Cuisine Division, Ministry of the Imperial Household)
Kazue Itoh - Takigawa (Lady-in-waiting of Empress Teimei)
Emi Wakui - Empress Teimei
Zen Kajihara - Emperor Showa
 Sapphira Van Doorn - Françoise

Episodes

Production
The drama was filmed in various locations in Japan (including Fukushima, Ibaraki, Kobe, Okayama) and in France. Takeru Satoh took cooking classes to portray the character and did the cooking scenes without a stand-in.

Accolades

References

External links
  
 
 

Japanese drama television series
2015 in Japanese television
2015 Japanese television series debuts
2015 Japanese television series endings
Nichiyō Gekijō
Television shows based on Japanese novels
Japanese cooking television series
Japanese historical television series
Television shows set in Tokyo
Television shows set in Fukui Prefecture